Karl Simin (born 1967) is an American scientist and assistant professor of cancer biology working with microarrays to study gene expression in engineered mouse models to gain insight into the biology of human tumors.

Early life
Karl was raised in the small town of Saline in south-eastern Michigan.

Education
University of Michigan, Ann Arbor, Ann Arbor, MI, United States	BS		Anthropology-Zoology
University of Utah School of Medicine, Salt Lake City, UT, United States

External links
 UMass Medical School - Karl Simin Bio

1967 births
Living people
American medical researchers
People from Saline, Michigan
University of Michigan College of Literature, Science, and the Arts alumni
University of Massachusetts Medical School faculty
University of Utah alumni